The 12461 / 12462 Mandore Express is a Superfast express train on India's broad-gauge network, connecting  (code: JU) and  (code: DLI), a distance of approximately 619 km. The train runs on Indian Railways broad-gauge line. The train gets a WDP-4 EMD locomotive and has a top speed of 110 km/h. The train has sleeper class, ac 3 tier, ac 2 tier and ac first class of accommodation.

Total Travel time is 10 hrs and 58 min and distance is 308 km on an avg speed of 58 km/h. Max permissible speed: 110 km/hr between RE – Rewari railway station and AWR

Schedule

Rake sharing

The train shares its rake with 12915 / 12916 Ashram Express.

Route & Halts

Traction

It is hauled by a Bhagat Ki Kothi-based WDP-4 / WDP-4B / WDP-4D locomotive on its entire journey.

See also 
Indian Railways

References

Transport in Delhi
Named passenger trains of India
Rail transport in Rajasthan
Transport in Jodhpur
Express trains in India
Rail transport in Haryana